The arefacta flower moth (Schinia arefacta) is a moth of the family Noctuidae. It is endemic to Florida and Georgia.

External links
Images

Schinia
Moths of North America